The Philippine Army Lady Troopers, also known as the Black  Mamba–Army Lady Troopers for sponsorship reasons, is the official women's professional volleyball team of the Philippine Army. The team is composed of enlisted personnel and reinforced with civilian players from time to time. The Lady Troopers competes in the Premier Volleyball League (PVL) and has won two Shakey's V-League (predecessor of the PVL) championships.

History
The Lady Troopers were the first champion in the Philippine Superliga (PSL), winning all two conferences of the inaugural season. The team played in the PSL in partnership with various corporate sponsors. During the 2013 season, it was sponsored by TMS Ship Agencies, Inc. and played as TMS-Philippine Army Lady Troopers and in the 2014 All-Filipino, it partnered with Generika Drugstore and played as the Generika-Army Lady Troopers. After a three conference absence, the team returned to the PSL for the 2016 season in partnership with another PSL team, the RC Cola Raiders and played under their banner as the RC Cola-Army Troopers. After another hiatus in 2017, the team partnered with the Smart Prepaid Giga Hitters and played as the Smart-Army Giga Hitters in the Invitational Cup of the 2018 PSL season. After its move to the Premier Volleyball League in the 2019 season, the team partnered with PacificTown Property Ventures Inc. and played as PacificTown–Army Lady Troopers. Following the cancellation of its 2020 season, the team returned for the 2021 season as the Black Mamba Army Lady Troopers backed by the sponsorship from Corbridge Group and its Black Mamba Energy Drink beverage.

Team colors 
Philippine Army Lady Troopers  
TMS-Philippine Army Lady Troopers (2013 PSL season)  
Generika-Army Lady Troopers (2014 PSL All-Filipino Conference)  
RC Cola-Army Troopers (2016 PSL season)    
Smart-Army Giga Hitters (2018 PSL Invitational Cup) 
PacificTown-Army Lady Troopers (2019 Premier Volleyball League season)  
Black Mamba-Army Lady Troopers (2021 Premier Volleyball League Open Conference season)  
Army-Black Mamba Energy Drink Lady Troopers (2022 Premier Volleyball League Invitational Conference)  United Auctioneers Army Lady Troopers (2022 Premier Volleyball League Reinforced Conference)

Current roster 

Head Coach
 Randy Fallorina
Assistant Coaches
 Patricia Siatan-Torres
 Patrick John Rojas

Team Manager
 Col. A. Divinagracia

Doctor
 
Physical Therapist
 Delos Reyes
Trainer
 A.P Tomas

Previous roster 

For the 2022 Premier Volleyball League Reinforced Conference:

Head Coach
 Emilio Reyes Jr.
Assistant Coaches
 Patricia Siatan-Torres
 Patrick John Rojas

Team Manager
 Col. A. Divinagracia

Doctor
 
Physical Therapist
 Delos Reyes
Trainer
 A.P Tomas

For the 2022 Premier Volleyball League Invitational Conference:

Head Coach
 Emilio Reyes Jr.
Assistant Coaches
 Patricia Siatan-Torres
 Patrick John Rojas

Team Manager
 Col. A. Divinagracia

Doctor
 
Physical Therapist
 Delos Reyes
Trainer
 A.P Tomas

For the 2022 Premier Volleyball League Open Conference:

Head Coach
 Emilio Reyes Jr.
Assistant Coaches
 Patricia Siatan-Torres
 Patrick John Rojas

Team Manager
 Col. A. Divinagracia

Doctor
 
Physical Therapist
 Delos Reyes
Trainer
 A.P Tomas

For the 2021 Premier Volleyball League Open Conference:

Head Coach
 Emilio Reyes Jr.
Assistant Coaches
 Patricia Siatan-Torres
 Patrick John Rojas

Team Manager
 Col. A. Divinagracia

Doctor
 
Physical Therapist
 Delos Reyes
Trainer
 A.P Tomas

For the 2019 Premier Volleyball League Open Conference:

Head Coach
 Emilio Reyes Jr.
Assistant Coaches
 Patricia Siatan-Torres
 Patrick John Rojas

Team Manager
 Col. A. Divinagracia

Doctor
 
Physical Therapist
 Delos Reyes
Trainer
 A.P Tomas

For the 2019 Premier Volleyball League Reinforced Conference:

Head coach
  Emilio Reyes Jr.
Assistant coaches
  Patricia Torres
  Patrick John Rojas
| valign="top" |

Team manager
  Col. A. Divinagracia
Doctor
  TBA
Physical Therapist
  Delos Reyes
Trainer
  Tomas

 Team Captain
 Import
 Draft Pick
 Rookie
 Inactive
 Suspended
 Free Agent
 Injured

For the 2018 PSL Invitational Cup:

Head coach
  Emilio Reyes Jr.
Assistant coaches
  Patricia Torres
  Patrick John Rojas
| valign="top" |

Team manager
  Col. A. Divinagracia
Doctor
  TBA
Physical Therapist
  Delos Reyes
Trainer
  Tomas

 Team Captain
 Import
 Draft Pick
 Rookie
 Inactive
 Suspended
 Free Agent
 Injured

For the 2016 PSL Invitational Cup:

Coaching staff
 Head Coach: Sgt. Emilio Reyes
 Assistant Coach(es): Sgt. Rico de Guzman

Team staff
 Team Manager: Brigader Gen. Elmer Pabale
 Team Utility: Melody Gutierrez

Medical staff
 Team Physician: 
 Physical Therapist: Alyssa Paula Tomas

For the 2014 PSL All-Filipino Conference:

Coaching staff
 Head Coach: Sgt. Rico de Guzman
 Assistant Coach(es): Sgt. Emilio Reyes  Pfc. Randy Fallorina

Team staff
 Team Manager: Brig. Gen. Victor Bayani
 Team Utility: Pfc. Melvin Carolino

Medical staff
 Team Physician: 
 Physical Therapist:  Louis Frederick Bahin, PTRP   Rey Jimenez Cruz, PTRP   Hubert Esteban, PTRP

For the Shakey's V-League 12th Season Reinforced Open Conference:

Coaching staff
 Head Coach: Sgt. Emilio Reyes
 Assistant Coach(es): Sgt. Rico de Guzman

Team staff
 Team Manager: Brigader Gen. Elmer Pabale
 Team Utility: Melody Gutierrez

Medical staff
 Team Physician: 
 Physical Therapist:Alyssa Paula Tomas

For the Shakey's V-League 12th Season Open Conference:

Coaching staff
 Head Coach: Sgt. Rico de Guzman
 Assistant Coach(es): Sgt. Emilio Reyes Pfc. Randy Fallorina

Team staff
 Team Manager: Brig. Gen. Victor Bayani
 Team Utility: Pfc. Melvin Carolino

Medical staff
 Team Physician: 
 Physical Therapist:

Honors

Team
Premier Volleyball League

Notes:

Shakey's V-League

Philippine Superliga:

Notes:

Others:

Individual
Premier Volleyball League

Philippine Super Liga:

Notes:

Shakey's V-League:

Team captains 
  Melody Villaceran Guttierez (2011)
  Mayeth Carolino (2012)
  Joanne Bunag (2013)
  Cristina Salak (2013, 2015, 2016)
  Ma. Theresa Iratay (2014, 2014)
  Michelle Carolino (2014)
  Jovelyn Gonzaga (2016, 2016, 2021, 2022)
  Mary Jean Balse-Pabayo (2018 - 2019)
  Honey Royse Tubino (2022)
  Angela Nunag (2023 - present)

Imports
Premier Volleyball League:

Philippine Superliga:

Notes:

Former players

Local players
 
 Jennylyn Reyes
 Mayeth Carolino
 Joyce Palad
 Jessey Laine De Leon
 Genie Salas
 Patricia Siatan-Torres 
 Aleona Denise Santiago-Manabat
 Carmina Aganon
 Cristina Salak
 Rachel Anne Daquis
 Abigail Maraño
 Mary Remy Joy Palma 
 Ma. Theresa Ilatay
 Jacqueline Alarca
 Joyce Palad 
 Dahlia Cruz 
 Christine Diane Francisco 
 Caitlin Viray 
 Alina Joyce Bicar
 Mary Dominique Pacres
 Mildred Thea Dizon 
 Fenela Risha Emnas
 Javen Sabas 
 Michelle Morente 
 Aiko Sweet Urdas 
 Necole Ebuen 

Foreign players

 Yuki Murakoshi

 Wanitchaya Luangtonglang

 Kiera Holst
 Hallie Ripley
 Jenelle Jordan

 Olena Lymareva-Flink

 Laura Condotta

See also
 Philippine Army Troopers

References

External links
 PSL-Generika-Philippine Army Lady Troopers Page
 2013 Philippine Super Liga Grand Prix Final Results
 Philippine Army Lady Troopers Shakey's V-League Page

Women's volleyball teams in the Philippines
Shakey's V-League
Philippine Super Liga
Sports teams in Metro Manila